John Yzendoorn  (born 17 September 1955) is an Australian former international soccer player who played for Heidelberg United, South Melbourne and Brunswick Juventus in the National Soccer League.

Club career
He started his career in his native England with Preston North End but was released in 1974 without making a first-team appearance. He then moved into non-league football and played for nearby Morecambe. Yzendoorn later moved to Australia and was signed by Heidelberg United in 1979, playing four seasons with the Melbourne-based club in the National Soccer League. He joined fierce rivals South Melbourne in 1983, and helped them to their first national championship in 1984. After three years with South Melbourne, he moved to Brunswick Juventus in 1986, where he spent the final three seasons of his national domestic career.

In 2009, he became one of the initial inductees into the South Melbourne Hall of Fame.

International career
Yzendoorn made his international debut at the age of 23, when he was selected by Rudi Gutendorf to play in a two-match series against Partizan Belgrade in 1979, where he came on as a substitute in both matches. His first 'A' international cap came against Czechoslovakia in 1980, where he again appeared off the bench in the Socceroos 2–2 draw at Olympic Park in Melbourne. He scored his first and only international goal in another 2–2 draw against Mexico in Sydney later that year. 

He became an Australian citizen in 1981 in order to play in Australia's 1982 FIFA World Cup qualifying matches. 

In all, Yzendoorn would play 13 'A' international matches for his country, his career ending during Australia's ill-fated 1982 World Cup qualifying campaign, where he was a key member of the squad which lost at home to New Zealand.

Rudi Gutendorf remarked about him: "From the first day on he sabotaged my work. He was the most unpleasant player I met in my career as a soccer coach. ...  Yzendoorn put a little Walkman inside our team sessions and put things that I said on tape. Later he played a few of my words in front of people from the press, but separate from their context."

Honours
With Heidelberg United:
  NSL Championship: 1980 (Runners-Up)
  NSL Cup: 1980, 1982 (Runners-Up)
With South Melbourne:
  NSL Championship: 1984
With Brunswick Juventus:
  NSL Cup: 1988 (Runners-Up)

References

External links
OzFootball profile
1979 Socceroos records
1980 Socceroos records
1981 Socceroos records

1955 births
Living people
Australian soccer players
Australia international soccer players
National Soccer League (Australia) players
Brunswick Juventus players
Heidelberg United FC players
South Melbourne FC players
Association football defenders